Capperia hellenica is a moth of the family Pterophoridae. It is found in Spain, France, Italy, Croatia, Bosnia and Herzegovina, North Macedonia and Greece. It has also been recorded from Malta and Asia Minor.

The wingspan is 10–14 mm. Adults are on wing from July to September.

The larvae feed on stiff hedgenettle (Stachys recta).

References

Oxyptilini
Moths described in 1951
Moths of Asia
Plume moths of Europe
Taxa named by Stanislaw Adamczewski